The Yunlin County Stadium is a multi-use stadium in Douliu City, Yunlin County, Taiwan. The stadium is able to hold 10,000 people.

Transportation
The stadium is accessible within walking distance South West from Douliu Station of the Taiwan Railways Administration.

See also
 List of stadiums in Taiwan

External links
 Yunlin County Stadium 

Buildings and structures in Yunlin County
Football venues in Taiwan